Computer Facts in Five is a 1982 video game published by The Avalon Hill Game Company.

Gameplay
Computer Facts in Five is a game in which each player must give five answers to each of five classes and of subject matter from popular subjects to academic ones, each round; an adaptation of the board game Facts in Five.

Reception
Ed Curtis reviewed the game for Computer Gaming World, and stated that "When the desire comes upon you for a change from arcade games, or from fighting against some historic army or mythological beast, CFIF should definitely be considered. Played solitaire or as a party game (where its abilities shine best), this game, with the vast number of options combinations available, will continue to be enjoyable for years to come."

Reviews
PC Magazine - Nov, 1983

References

External links
Review in SoftSide
Review in Electronic Games

1982 video games
Apple II games
Atari 8-bit family games
Avalon Hill video games
DOS games
Quiz video games
Video games based on board games
Video games developed in the United States